Alamgir Hyder Khan (1954-2016) was a Bangladesh Nationalist Party politician and the former Member of Parliament of Extinct Chandpur-6 (now Chandpur-4) seat.

Career
Khan was elected to parliament from Chandpur-6 as a Bangladesh Nationalist Party candidate in 1991, 1996, and 2001.

Death
Khan died on 13 April 2016 at Apollo Hospital, Dhaka, Bangladesh.

References

1949 births
2016 deaths
People from Chandpur District
Bangladesh Nationalist Party politicians
5th Jatiya Sangsad members
6th Jatiya Sangsad members
7th Jatiya Sangsad members
8th Jatiya Sangsad members